Illinois Route 40 (IL 40) is a  north–south route in central portion of the U.S. state of Illinois. It runs from Interstate 74 (I-74) in East Peoria north to IL 78 at Mt. Carroll, just south of U.S. Route 52 (US 52) and IL 64.

Route description 

Illinois 40 is known as Knoxville Avenue in the Peoria area, generally south of Illinois Route 6. Route 40 crosses over Interstate 74 north of downtown, and then grows complex in the downtown area, as there are three turns in a one-block length. Illinois 40 then emerges onto William Kumpf Boulevard and crosses over the Illinois River using the Bob Michel Bridge. On the other side of the river, Illinois 40 is briefly called Washington Street. It then is routed onto an onramp to Interstate 74, where there is an exit to Camp Street before terminating at I-74.

History 
Originally, SBI Route 40 ran from Sterling to Stockton. In 1935, IL 40 got cut back to Mount Carroll in favor of IL 78. By 1938, Illinois Route 88 entirely acquired IL 40 north of Sterling. In 1987, Illinois Route 5, a four-lane freeway which crosses Illinois 40, was designated Interstate 88 east of I-80. As of 1995, IDOT redesignated Illinois 88 as Illinois 40 to prevent confusion. Although the new number is also the number of a Federal Highway that passes through Illinois (U.S. Route 40), a great enough distance exists between them that the possibility of confusing one for the other is negligible.

Prior to 2003, the Illinois 40 exit on I-74 southeast of Peoria was called "Industrial Spur". As part of the Upgrade 74 Project, the exit was renamed by the Illinois Department of Transportation to Riverfront Drive.

Major intersections

References 

040
Transportation in Tazewell County, Illinois
Transportation in Peoria County, Illinois
Transportation in Marshall County, Illinois
Transportation in Stark County, Illinois
Transportation in Bureau County, Illinois
Transportation in Whiteside County, Illinois
Transportation in Carroll County, Illinois